Ceramea singularis is a species of moth of the family Tortricidae. It is found in Myanmar.

References

Archipini
Moths described in 1951
Moths of Asia
Taxa named by Alexey Diakonoff